The Aristides Carlos Rodrigues Museum is located at Avenue Pereira Rego, 1000, in the town of Candelária, in the state of Rio Grande do Sul, Brazil. It is a museum of Geopark of Paleorrota with information on the region. It was inaugurated in July 2001.

Collection
Collection of personal effects, machinery, household utensils and work of German settlers, paleontology, archeology.

Sets out various species of fossils from the Triassic Period, such as Dicynodont, Karamuru vorax and rhynchosaur. The collection also includes a replica of Guaibasaurus candelarienses, discovered in Sanga Pinheiro.

Many fossils collected in the city, were aimed at the Museum. The UFRGS has made many collections of fossils in this city and this has helped the museum grow.

Gallery

References

External links

Fossils of Candelária. 
Bulletin of the Brazilian Society of Paleontology. 

Archaeological museums in Brazil
Geology museums in Brazil
Natural history museums in Brazil
Museums established in 2001
Museum Aristides Carlos Rodrigues
Museums in Rio Grande do Sul
Fossil museums